Keener Cave or Keener is an extinct town in southern Wayne County, in the U.S. state of Missouri. The GNIS classifies it as a populated place. 

The cave and associated community lies above the west bank of the Black River on Missouri Route JJ just north of the Wayne-Butler county line. The community of Keeners lies just to the southeast in Butler County on the east bank of the river.

Variant names were "Keener" and "Keener Cave Resort". The community most likely has the name of a family who were active in the local lumber industry.  A post office called Keeners was established in 1877, and remained in operation until 1879.

References

Ghost towns in Missouri
Former populated places in Wayne County, Missouri